Koritnik may refer to:

 Koritnik, mountain located in north-eastern Albania and south of Kosovo
 Koritnik (Breza), village in the municipality of Breza, Bosnia and Herzegovina
 Koritnik (Višegrad), village in the municipality of Višegrad, Bosnia and Herzegovina
 Koritnik (Ivanjica), village in the municipality of Ivanjica in Serbia